Samuel Wallin (July 31, 1856 – December 1, 1917) was a U.S. Representative from New York.

Born in Easton, Pennsylvania, Wallin moved with his parents to Amsterdam, New York, in 1864. He attended the public schools and Amsterdam Academy. He engaged in the manufacture of carpets and rugs.

He served as alderman (1889–1892). He was the Mayor of Amsterdam, N.Y. (1900–1901)  and a delegate to the 1916 Republican National Convention.

Wallin was elected as a Republican to the Sixty-third Congress (March 4, 1913 – March 3, 1915).
He was not a candidate for renomination in 1914.

He resumed his business activities in Amsterdam, where he died December 1, 1917. He was interred in Green Hill Cemetery.

Sources

External links

1856 births
1917 deaths
Politicians from Easton, Pennsylvania
People from Amsterdam, New York
American people of Swedish descent
Mayors of places in New York (state)
Businesspeople from New York (state)
Burials in New York (state)
Republican Party members of the United States House of Representatives from New York (state)
19th-century American politicians
19th-century American businesspeople